Ulia Ulia (born 13 June 1980, in Afega) Ututa'aloga Charlie Ulia of Afega  is a Samoan rugby union flanker.  He is married to Elizabeth Lameta-Ulia and has 5 kids:  Kenneth Ulia, Ulia Ulia, Elaine Ulia, Desiree Amy Ulia and Havilani Elizabeth Ulia.   He was a member of the Samoa national rugby union team that participated at the 2007 Rugby World Cup.

References

1980 births
Living people
Rugby union flankers
Samoan rugby union players
Samoa international rugby union players
People from Tuamasaga